Highlandville may refer to:

 Highlandville, Iowa
 Highlandville, Missouri